Munir A. Pirzada (3 January 1937  2 November 2019) was a Pakistani professional tennis player and the former Secretary of Pakistan Tennis Federation. He played forty-seven first-class matches, including 1956 Wimbledon Championships and Davis Cup tournaments.

He won 28 first class matches out of 47 throughout his career, leading him to retain his position in national championship from 1956 to 1960. In 1956, he also played in Australian Open and Roland Garros tournaments.

References

External links 
 

1937 births
2019 deaths
Pakistani male tennis players
Missing middle or first names